The Embassy of Fiji to Belgium is responsible for Fiji's diplomatic relations with the Belgium.  Established in July 1973, it doubles as Fiji's Mission to the European Union.  The Ambassador to Belgium, currently Ratu Seremaia Tui Cavuilati,  also holds the title of Permanent Representative to the European Union. He is assisted by two Counsellors (Tupou Raturaga and Nidhendra Singh, who is responsible for agriculture and trade) and by Ms N. Khatri, the Second Secretary.  In addition, there are three supporting staff.

List of Ambassadors 
The following individuals have held office as Ambassador to Belgium.

External links 
 Official website of Fiji's Mission to the European Union / Embassy to Belgium

Belgium Embassy
Fiji
Diplomatic missions of Fiji